Soldier of Fortune is a TVB television series, premiered on 27 September 1982. Theme song "Heart Debt" composition and arrangement by Joseph Koo, lyricist by Wong Jim, sung by Anita Mui.

Cast
 Felix Wong
 Kent Tong
 Siu-Fai Cheung
 Patricia Chong - Poon Hiu-ton 
 Stephen Chow - Student
 Francis Ng - Student
 Wilson Lam - Student
 Berg Ng - Student
 Tony Leung

References 

1982 Hong Kong television series debuts
1982 Hong Kong television series endings
TVB dramas
1980s Hong Kong television series
Cantonese-language television shows